The Intellectual Property Corporation of Malaysia Act 2002, is a Malaysian laws which enacted to establish the Intellectual Property Corporation of Malaysia and to provide for its functions and powers and for matters connected therewith.

Structure
The Intellectual Property Corporation of Malaysia Act 2002, in its current form (1 January 2006), consists of 7 Parts containing 41 sections and 2 schedules (including no amendment).
Part I: Preliminary
Part II: The Corporation
Part III: Functions and Powers of the Corporation
Part IV: Provisions Relating to Employees
Part V: Finance
Part VI: General
Schedules

References

External links
 Intellectual Property Corporation of Malaysia Act 2002 

2002 in Malaysian law
Malaysian federal legislation
Malaysian intellectual property law